Methylorubrum is a genus of bacteria from the family Methylobacteriaceae.

References

Hyphomicrobiales
Bacteria genera